11:11 is the fourth studio album by the Colombian singer-songwriter Maluma, released on 17 May 2019 by Sony Music Latin. The album features guest appearances from Ricky Martin, Ozuna, Nicky Jam, Zion & Lennox, Madonna, Sech, Ty Dolla Sign, Chencho and Farina. To promote the album, Maluma went on the 11:11 World Tour in 2019. It was supported by four singles: "HP," "11 PM," "Instinto Natural," and "No Se Me Quita," and the promotional single "Déjale Saber." The album was noted by critics as being noticeably cleaner and more romantic than his previous projects.

The album debuted at number 30 on the US Billboard 200 and number 1 on the Top Latin Albums chart with first week sales of 17,000.

Promotion

Singles
On 10 August 2018, the album's expected lead single, "Mala Mía," was released digitally on music stores and streaming services. A notable remix of the song featuring the American and Brazilian singers, Becky G and Anitta, was released on 21 December 2018. During the track list reveal leading up to the release of the album, it was announced that the song would not be included on the album. The song peaked at number 23 on the US Billboard Bubbling Under Hot 100 songs chart and at number nine on the US Billboard Hot Latin Songs chart.

"HP" was released digitally on music stores and streaming services on 28 February 2019 as the album's official lead single. The song peaked at number 96 on the US Billboard Hot 100 songs chart and at number eight on the US Billboard Hot Latin Songs chart.

"11 PM" was released with the album digitally on music stores and streaming services on 17 May 2018, as the album's second official single. The song peaked at number 14 on the US Billboard Bubbling Under Hot 100 songs chart and at number 11 on the US Billboard Hot Latin Songs chart.

"Instinto Natural" featuring Sech was released on 9 August 2019, as the album's third official single. It peaked at number 76 on the Billboard Argentina Hot 100.

"No Se Me Quita" was the album's fourth official single released on 30 August 2019. The song peaked at number 26 on the Billboard Argentina Hot 100, and reached number one on Mexico charts, where it was certified 4×Platinum.

Promotional singles
On 16 May 2019, Maluma released the promotional single "Déjale Saber", with a pseudo video to support, a treatment which all of the standard non-single album tracks received on the release date of 11:11.

Pseudo videos and other charting songs
On the release date of the album, similarly to the promotional single "Déjale Saber", accompanying pseudo video clips were released for all of 11:11'''s non-single tracks on Maluma's YouTube channel. Following the release of the album, "Dispuesto" featuring Ozuna charted at number 47 on the US Billboard Hot Latin Songs chart and at 92 on the Spanish Promusicae chart. "Soltera" featuring Madonna and "Tu Vecina" featuring Ty Dolla Sign peaked at number 7 and 13 on the US Billboard Latin Digital Song Sales chart respectively.

Critical reception

In a positive review by Nick Levine from New Musical Express'', in which he gave the album four out of five stars, he concluded by writing, "At 16 tracks, '11:11' is definitely a little long, but there's no denying that Maluma creates a mood that suits his persona every bit as effectively as Drake does. Stylish, sexy and right-on-trend, this album should generate some heat from Bogotá to Bognor."

Track listing

Charts

Weekly charts

Year-end charts

Certifications

Release history

References

2019 albums
Maluma albums
Sony Music Latin albums
Spanish-language albums
Albums produced by Ilya Salmanzadeh